Wang Zheng may refer to:

 Wang Zheng (singer) (born 1985), female Chinese pop singer
 Wang Zheng (hammer thrower) (born 1987), female Chinese hammer thrower
 Wang Zheng (sport shooter) (born 1979), male Chinese sport shooter
 Wang Zheng (newsreader), (born 1979), female Chinese newsreader
 Wang Zheng (pilot) (born 1972), the first Chinese pilot to fly solo around the world
 Wang Zheng (born 1959), a vice admiral of the People's Liberation Army Navy.

See also
 Wang Zhen (disambiguation)